The 2007 New England Revolution season was the twelfth season of the team's existence, and the third straight season to end in the MLS Cup Final. It began on April 7 with a 1–0 road loss against the Chicago Fire and ended on November 19 with a 2–1 loss to the Houston Dynamo in the finals of the MLS Cup, a repeat of the previous year's MLS Cup Final. To date, it is the only season where the Revs won any domestic competition, as they were the 2007 US Open Cup champions.

Squad

First-team squad
As of October 13, 2007.

Transfers

In

|-

|-

|-

|-

|-

|-

|-

|-
|}

Out

|-

|-

|-

|-

|-

|-

|-

|-

|-

|-

Club

Management

Other information

Standings

Major League Soccer

Eastern Conference

Results

Matches

MLS regular season

MLS playoffs

U.S. Open Cup

References

External links 

New England Revolution seasons
New England Revolution
New England Revolution
New England Revolution
Sports competitions in Foxborough, Massachusetts
2007